Amata albapex is a moth of the family Erebidae.

References

Moths of Asia
Moths described in 1893